Gilbert-Antoine Duchêne  (29 July 1919 – 29 November 2009) was a French bishop of the Roman Catholic Church.

Duchênet was born in Moussey, France and was ordained a priest on 14 July 1946. He was appointed Auxiliary bishop of the Diocese of Metz as well as Titular bishop of Tela on 18 September 1971 and ordained bishop on 11 December 1971. Duchênet was appointed Bishop of the Diocese of Saint-Claude on 10 June 1975 and retired from diocese on 1 December 1994.

External links
Gilbert-Antoine Duchêne's profile at Catholic Hierarchy.org

1919 births
2009 deaths
Bishops of Metz
20th-century Roman Catholic bishops in France